Yıldız Aras (born November 10, 1977 in Istanbul, Turkey) is a Turkish karateka competing in the kumite +60 kg and open divisions. Aras is member of the Kocaeli Büyükşehir Belediyesi Kağıt Spor Kulübü Karate team. As of May 2009, she is world's best in women's kumite open division.

Personal life
She was born as the fifth daughter to her father from Kars / Arpaçay and to her mother from Sivas /zara. She is a graduate of the School of Physical Education and Sports at the Marmara University in Istanbul.

Sports career
Inspired from the TV films depicting martial arts that became very popular in Turkey in the late 1980s, she entered in 1987, at the age of only 10, into a karate course in her neighborhood. She became a member of the Ersoy Çırlar Sport Club. Her first trainer was Yüksel Baltay, a former national karateka.

Aras was admitted to the national team in 1994. She has been nicknamed by foreign sportspeople as the "Strong Girl". Holding three world champion titles, seven European champion titles, and three Mediterranean Games champion titles, she is the most successful Turkish sportsperson ever, but without any Olympic medal, since karate is not an acknowledged discipline at the Olympic Games.

Achievements

Individual
2009
 44th European Championships in Zagreb, Croatia – May 8–10 – kumite +68 kg 
2008
 43rd European Championships in Tallinn, Estonia – May 2–4 – kumite +60 kg , kumite open 
2007
 42nd European Championships in Bratislava, Slovakia – May 4–6 – kumite +60 kg , kumite open 
 Italian Open in Monza, Italy – March 31-April 1 – kumite +60 kg – 5th
2006
 18th World Championships in Tampere, Finland – October 12–15 – kumite open 
 41st European Championships in Stavanger, Norway – May 5–7 – kumite +60 kg , kumite open 
2005
 World Games in Duisburg, Germany – July 23–24 – kumite open 
 15th Mediterranean Games in Almeria, Spain – June 24-July 3 – kumite +65 kg , kumite open 
 40th European Championships in Tenerife, Spain – May 13–15 – kumite +60 kg , kumite open 
2004
 39th European Championships in Moscow, Russia – May 7–9 – kumite open 
2003
 38th European Championships in Bremen, Germany – May 9–11 – kumite +60 kg , kumite open 
2002
 37th European Championships in Tallinn, Estonia – May 3–5 – kumite open 
2001
 14th Mediterranean Games in Tunis, Tunisia – September 2–15 – kumite open 
2000
 2nd World University Karate Championships in Kyoto, Japan – July 7–9 – kumite +60 kg 
 15th World Championships in Munich, Germany – October 12–15 – kumite open 
 35th European Championships in Istanbul, Turkey – May 5–7 – kumite open 
1998
 14th World Championships in Rio de Janeiro, Brazil – October 18 – kumite open 
1997
 World Cup in Manila, Philippines – September 13–14 – kumite open 
 24th European Cadet & Junior Championships in Greece – kumite +60 kg 
 13th Mediterranean Games in Bari, Italy – June 13–25 – kumite open 
1996
 31st European Championships in Paris, France – May 3–5 – kumite open

Team
2004
 39th European Championships in Moscow, Russia – May 7–9 – kumite female team 
 17th World Championships in Monterrey, Mexico – November 18–21 – kumite female team 
2002
 16th World Championships in Madrid, Spain – November 21–24 – kumite female team 
2001
 36th European Championships in Sofia, Bulgaria – May 11–13 – kumite female team 
2000
 2nd World University Karate Championships in Kyoto, Japan – July 7–9 – kumite female team 
 35th European Championships in Istanbul, Turkey – May 5–7 – kumite female team 
1999
 34th European Championships in Euboea, Greece – May 21–23 – kumite female team 
1998
 33rd European Championships in Belgrade, Yugoslavia – May 8–10 – kumite female team 
 14th World Championships in Rio de Janeiro, Brazil – October 18 – kumite female team 
1997
 32nd European Championships in Santa Cruz de Tenerife, Spain – May 2–4 – kumite female team

World ranking
As of May 9, 2009, she ranks:
 World: 3rd
 Kumite female +60 kg  (World): 8th
 Kumite female +68 kg  (World): 3rd
 Kumite female open  (World): 1st

See also
 Turkish women in sports

References

Living people
1977 births
Sportspeople from Istanbul
Marmara University alumni
Turkish female karateka
Turkish female martial artists
Kocaeli Büyükşehir Belediyesi Kağıt Spor athletes
Mediterranean Games gold medalists for Turkey
Mediterranean Games silver medalists for Turkey
Competitors at the 1997 Mediterranean Games
Competitors at the 2001 Mediterranean Games
Competitors at the 2005 Mediterranean Games
World Games gold medalists
Competitors at the 2005 World Games
Mediterranean Games medalists in karate
World Games medalists in karate
21st-century Turkish sportswomen